Andy de la Tour (born 1948) is an English actor and screenwriter.

In films he appeared in Plenty, Notting Hill, the Roman Polanski's Oliver Twist, 44 Inch Chest, and The Confessions, and in television The Young Ones,  Filthy Rich & Catflap, Bottom, Kavanagh QC and The Brief. On stage, he has appeared at the National Theatre in Harold Pinter's No Man's Land in 2001 and Alan Bennett's People in 2012.

His credits as a television writer include Boon, Lovejoy, Peak Practice, The Vet, Kavanagh QC and Clem. He wrote the stage play Safe In Our Hands (winner of the LWT Plays on Stage Award).

As a stand-up comedian, he appeared in the 1980s with Rik Mayall, Ben Elton and French and Saunders. In 2012, he wrote Stand-Up or Die about his time as a stand-up comedian in New York.

He appeared as George Porter in episode 13 of series 31 of Casualty "Not in Holby Anymore" and as General Hurst Romodi in Rogue One: A Star Wars Story. On 6 June 2018 he appeared as Ted, an aging mechanic with a heart defect in BBC1's lunchtime soap Doctors.

On 27 January 2019, he signed an open letter in The Guardian expressing opposition to the USA's handling of the political situation in Venezuela and calling for more dialogue with the president, Nicolás Maduro.

He is the brother of actress Frances de la Tour and partner of actress Susan Wooldridge.

Filmography

References

External links

1948 births
Living people
20th-century English male actors
21st-century English male actors
British male television writers
British television writers
English dramatists and playwrights
English male dramatists and playwrights
English male film actors
English male television actors
English people of French descent
Place of birth missing (living people)